Giuseppe Fioroni (born 14 October 1958), often nicknamed Beppe, is an Italian politician, and a former member of the Democratic Party (PD).

Early life and education
Fioroni was born on 14 October 1958 in Viterbo. He is a graduate in medicine.

Career
Fioroni served as a Christian Democrat Mayor of Viterbo from 1989 to 1995. He was first elected as a deputy in 1996, being re-elected for the third consecutive time in the 2006 election. He was formerly the Italian Minister of Education in the Prodi II Cabinet from 2006 to 2008. 
After leaving his post, he served as a shadow welfare minister for the Democratic Party.

References 

People from Viterbo
1958 births
Living people
People from the Province of Viterbo
Democracy is Freedom – The Daisy politicians
21st-century Italian politicians
Università Cattolica del Sacro Cuore alumni
Education ministers of Italy
Mayors of places in Lazio